George Douglas (birth unknown – death unknown) was a Scottish rugby union and rugby league footballer.

Rugby union
He also played for Jedforest RFC.

Rugby league
Douglas transferred to Batley during the 1921–22 season.

Championship final appearances
George Douglas played left-, i.e. number 11, in Batley's 13–7 victory over Wigan in the 1923–24 Championship Final during the 1923–24 season, at The Cliff, Broughton, Salford on Saturday 3 May 1924, in front of a crowd of 13,729.

County Cup Final appearances
George Douglas played left-, i.e. number 11, in Batley's 0–5 defeat by York in the 1922–23 Yorkshire County Cup Final during the 1922–23 season at Headingley Rugby Stadium, Leeds on Saturday 2 December 1922, in front of a crowd of 33,719, and played right-, i.e. number 12, in the 8–9 defeat by Wakefield Trinity in the 1924–25 Yorkshire County Cup Final during the 1924–25 season at Headingley Rugby Stadium, Leeds on Saturday 22 November 1924, in front of a crowd of 25,546.

References
 Bath, Richard (ed.) The Scotland Rugby Miscellany (Vision Sports Publishing Ltd, 2007 )

Batley Bulldogs players
Jed-Forest RFC players
Scottish rugby union players
Scottish rugby league players
Scotland international rugby union players